|}

The Silver Tankard Stakes is a Listed flat horse race in Great Britain open to two-year-old horses. It is run at Pontefract over a distance of 1 mile and 6 yards (1,615 metres), and it is scheduled to take place each year in October.

History
The event was established in 1993, and the inaugural running was won by Barbaroja. It has held Listed status throughout its history.

The Silver Tankard Stakes is currently staged on the third or fourth Monday in October. It is part of Pontefract's last racing fixture of the year.

Records
Leading jockey (2 wins):
 Michael Hills – Entice (1996), Gulland (1997)
 Richard Hills – Hataab (1999), Nakheel (2005)
 Seb Sanders – Battle Chant (2002), Comic Strip (2004)
 Adam Kirby - Prince Gagarin (2014), Connect (2017)
 William Buick -  D'bai (2016), Local Dynasty (2022) 

Leading trainer (4 wins):
 Mick Channon – Worthily (2000), Sweet Lilly (2006), Siberian Tiger (2007), Gallic Star (2009)

Winners

See also
 Horse racing in Great Britain
 List of British flat horse races

References
 Racing Post:
 pedigreequery.com – Silver Tankard Stakes – Pontefract.

Flat races in Great Britain
Pontefract Racecourse
Flat horse races for two-year-olds
Recurring sporting events established in 1993
1993 establishments in England